Minuscule 684 (in the Gregory-Aland numbering), Θε34 (von Soden), is a Greek minuscule manuscript of the New Testament, on parchment. It is dated by a colophon to the year 1228. The manuscript has complex contents. Scrivener labelled it by 1146e.

Description 

The codex contains the text of the four Gospels, on 300 parchment leaves (size ). The text is written in one column per page, 42 lines per page.
The biblical text is surrounded by a catena, of the authorship of Theophylact.

Text 

The Greek text of the codex is a representative of the Byzantine text-type. Kurt Aland placed it in Category V.

It was not examined by using the Claremont Profile Method.

History 

Currently the manuscript is dated by the INTF to the 13th century.

According to the colophon the manuscript was written by monk Gregorius in 1228. It once belonged to Giulio Giustiniani in Venice. It was examined by Bernard de Montfaucon (Diarium Italicum, p. 433-437).

It was previously in the private collation of the Earl of Leicester at Holkham Hall, before it was purchased by the Bodleian Library in 1956.

It was added to the list of New Testament manuscript by Scrivener (1146) and Gregory (684).

The manuscript is now housed at the Bodleian Library (Holkham Gr. 64) in Oxford.

See also 

 List of New Testament minuscules
 Biblical manuscript
 Textual criticism

References

Further reading 

 Bernard de Montfaucon,  Diarium Italicum (English ed. here), p. 433-437

Greek New Testament minuscules
13th-century biblical manuscripts
Bodleian Library collection